Stošić (Cyrillic script: Стошић) is a Serbian surname. Notable people with the surname include:

 Daliborka Stošić
 James Stosic
 Miodrag Stošić
 Stevan Stošić
 Vlada Stošić

See also
 Zorica Dimitrijević-Stošić

Serbian surnames
Croatian surnames